Bagrami is a village situated in the eastern fringes of Kabul at  and 1797 m altitude, part of municipal District 12 and partly in District 22. The population is 31,680 (2007 calculation). Downtown Kabul can be reached in 30 minutes. The Bagrami Industrial Park is one of the major projects for the economy of the region. In 2010, the town also harboured a shanty town of mud-built huts from refugees escaping the violence of the Taliban insurgency in the southern provinces of Afghanistan.

Climate
Bagrami has a hot-summer humid continental climate (Köppen climate classification: Dsa). July is the warmest month of the year. The temperature in July averages . At  on average, January is the coldest month of the year.

About  of precipitation falls annually.

See also 
Kabul Province

Notes

Populated places in Kabul Province